Mrs. Lovett Cameron or Caroline "Emily" Sharp (1844 – 1921) was a British romantic fiction author. She wrote more than fourteen three-volume novels.

Life
Caroline Emily Sharp was born in 1844 in London to a well-off family who began her education by sending her to Paris at the age of six to learn French. In France she stayed in the Rue de Concelles with the Nizard family. Mr. Nizard later went on to be a French senator. She went to boarding school in England and then returned home. Her requests to become a writer were denied, despite the evidence that she preferred writing to needlework. At some time she and two of her brothers started a publication called the City Advertiser but it was discontinued after six months.

Marriage
She married Henry Lovett Cameron who was a parliamentary agent in the Treasury in 1867. Her brother-in-law was Verney Lovett Cameron who was an explorer. Her own brother taught her to canoe and to scull.

At her husband's instigation she started to write, achieving moderate success with her first novel, Juliette's Guardian, which was published in a magazine and then as a book in 1877. This melodrama dealt with the affair between the 17-year-old Juliette Blair and her guardian Colonel Fleming. Lovett Cameron worked to a daily timetable, writing over forty books between 1877 and 1905. A later novel, In a Grass County, went to a ninth edition. The formula of her novels dealt with a relationship that hints at the emerging risk of sex and sin, but the narrative then backs off to deal with the emerging love and romance.

By the 1880s her brother-in-law, Verney, also took to writing, but he published books for boys.

She was known as "Emily" but she wrote under the name of "Mrs. Lovett Cameron". In 1891 she contributed a chapter to the unusual novel The Fate of Fenella, a three-volume novel created without discussion by twelve male and twelve female writers, including Bram Stoker and Arthur Conan Doyle.

Lovett Cameron's approach emphasised domesticity and the married woman's role. She was not a "New Woman" and her writings denigrated women of such a persuasion. In 1895 The Triumph of a Snipe Pie, better known as The Man who Didn't, was published. This story describes how a married man successfully resists the guiles of another woman. The book's title echoed the scandalous story The Woman Who Did by the Canadian writer Grant Allen which portrayed a "New Woman" favorably. Allen's book told of Herminia Barton, a woman who opted for "free love" because she refused to be a slave to any man.

Cameron's last published novel was 'Rosamond Grant' (1905). She died at her home in 1921.

References

External links
 
 
 Works by Mrs. Lovett Cameron at the Open Library

1844 births
1921 deaths
Writers from London
British women novelists
British romantic fiction writers
Women romantic fiction writers
19th-century British novelists
20th-century British novelists
20th-century British women writers
19th-century British women writers
19th-century British writers